Bartholf Senff (2 September 1815  25 June 1900) was an eminent German music publisher from Friedrichshall, Coburg. In 1850, he founded the publishing house which bears his name in Leipzig. His catalog contains original editions of Mendelssohn, Brahms, Gade, Hiller, and Rubinstein, as well as the education works by Louis Köhler. In addition, Senff was the founder, editor, and proprietor of the well known periodical Signale für die musikalische Welt.

1815 births
1900 deaths
German publishers (people)